Stichaeopsis is a genus of marine ray-finned fishes belonging to the family Stichaeidae, the pricklebacks or shannies. These fishes are found in the western North Pacific Ocean.

Taxonomy
Stichaeopsis was first proposed as a monospecific genus in 1870 by the Austrian ichthyologist Rudolf Kner with Stichaeopsis nana, which was described as a new species by Kner from Decastris Bay on the Tatar Strait in the northern Sea of Japan, as its only species. This genus is classified within the subfamily Stichaeinae of the Zoarcoid family Stichaeidae.

Species  
Stichaeopsis contains three extant and one known extinct species, as follows: 

† means extinct

Etymology
Stichaeopsis means "having the appearance of Stichaeus, by which Kner is thought to have meant that the type species S. nana was similar in appearance to Stichaeus species.

Characteristics
Stichaeopsis fishes have moderately elongated bodies which has strong lateral compression and has no scales. The jaws are equal in length and have pointed teeth in them but there are no teeth on trhe roof of the mouth. There are no soft rays, only spines in the dorsal fin, all but the forwardmost being rigid. The pelvic fins have their insertion in front of the pectoral fins. They have three lateral lines. The largest published maximum standard length is in S. epallax which has attained .

Distribution and habitat
Stichaeopsis species are found in the northwest Pacific Ocean in the Sea of Japan, Sea of Okhtosk, Strait of Tartary, off Sakhalin and the Kuril Islands.

References

Stichaeinae